L'Armonia was an Italian language newspaper established in Turin in July 1848. It was established by a Catholic priest Giacomo Margotti and other priests. Margotti also edited it. It was ultra-conservative and Catholic in orientation. Its mission was to support for the Catholic Church. It was the first Italian publication to publish an account and several sections of the Book of Mormon. This content was published on 1 August 1853 in a supplement.

Among other causes, the paper opposed Italian unification.

References

1848 establishments in Italy
Catholic newspapers published in Italy
Defunct newspapers published in Italy
Italian-language newspapers
Newspapers published in Turin
Publications established in 1848
Publications with year of disestablishment missing
Conservatism in Italy